The Hatf I (official codename: Hatf–I) is a tactical battlefield range ballistic missile jointly designed and developed by the Space Research Commission and the Kahuta Research Laboratories (KRL) in 1980s. After its successful tests, the Hatf-I entered in the service with Pakistan Army in 1990. It is deployed as an artillery rocket and has been replaced by the improved Hatf-IA and Hatf-IB, which have a maximum range of 100 km.

Development and design

In 1980s, the development on Hatf program began when the chief of army staff General Mirza Beg held a meeting with the Space Research Commission in an attempt to counter the Indian development of the Prithvi. The program was developed with the assistance from the KRL whose team hastily combined various available technologies to produce the first surface-to-surface missiles. The scientists at the Space Research Commission designed the Hatf-I as a highly mobile missile for tactical use. The design is said to have been derived from the second-stage of the French Eridan missile system. Its major use is as an unguided general bombardment weapon, to be fired across a battlefield or at a general target area. If properly aimed, it can hit within several hundred meters of the target area. The missile is low cost and easy to produce and maintain in large numbers. The Hatf I missile development program dates back to the 1980s. The Hatf-I was officially revealed by Pakistani officials in 1989 and it is believed to have entered service in 1992.

As it is unguided, it should be considered a long-range artillery shell, with the location of the impact depending upon the proper direction, angle of launch and the ability of the missile to fly straight. The Hatf-I is deployed with high explosive or cluster munitions, although it can theoretically carry a tactical nuclear weapon. The missile has a diameter of 0.56 m and is 6 m in length. It uses a single-stage solid propellant rocket motor.

The Hatf IA and Hatf IB are upgraded versions with improved range and accuracy. The Hatf IA increased maximum range to 100 km by using an improved rocket motor and lighter materials in the missile's construction. The dimensions and the payload capacity remain the same. Hatf-IA is believed to have entered service in 1995.

The Hatf IB represents the final evolution of the Hatf I missile system. It includes an inertial guidance system that considerably improves the accuracy of the missile and is otherwise identical to the Hatf IA, retaining the maximum range of 100 km and payload of 500 kg. The inertial guidance system allows the missile to be used as an artillery rocket against enemy military encampments or storage depots etc. The missile system is designed to be used like an artillery system, with 5–6 missiles fired simultaneously at the target area. Being a ballistic missile the Hatf-IB would reach its target much quicker than an ordinary artillery shell giving the target little warning to take evasive action.

Hatf-IB was first flight tested in February 2000. All current Hatf-I missiles have been upgraded to Hatf-IB standard as of 2001. The system is operational with Pakistan's armed forces.

Variants
 Hatf I — Maximum range:   Payload:  , unguided.
 Hatf IA — Maximum range:   Payload: , unguided.
 Hatf IB — Maximum range:   Payload:  , inertial guidance.

References

Nuclear history of Pakistan
SUPARCO missions
Weapons and ammunition introduced in 1989
Short-range ballistic missiles of Pakistan